Rena Lalgie is a British civil servant serving  as Governor of Bermuda since 2020. She is the first woman, and the first person of African-Caribbean heritage, to be appointed governor of Bermuda.

Career
Lalgie has worked in various roles for the Home Office, the Cabinet Office, and the Department for Business, Innovation and Skills. She was director of operations at UK Trade & Investment, now the Department for International Trade. She then became head of the Office of Financial Sanctions Implementation (OFSI), created within the UK Treasury in 2016 to implement and enforce financial sanctions.

References

Year of birth missing (living people)
Living people
British civil servants
Black British people
Black British women
Governors of Bermuda
21st-century British women politicians